Hopes, Wishes and Dreams is the second and final solo album by Ray Thomas of The Moody Blues in conjunction with Nicky James and the orchestral arrangements of Terry James, released under The Moody Blues own Threshold Label as THS17 in June 1976. The album was also available in cassette and cartridge. It was reissued on Compact Disc in September 1989 and as part of a box set in 2010. The album produced one single, "One Night Stand" (B-side "Carousel"), which was released in July 1976 in the UK and August 1976 in the United States.

Original track listing 
All songs co-written by Ray Thomas and Nicky James, except where noted.

Side 1
"In Your Song" (Nicky James) – 4:30
"Friends" – 2:57
"We Need Love" – 4:17
"Within Your Eyes" – 3:27
"One Night Stand" – 3:37

Side 2
"Keep On Searching" – 4:52
"Didn't I" – 3:46
"Migration" – 3:41
"Carousel" – 3:52
"The Last Dream" (Ray Thomas) – 4:52

All titles ASCAPRecorded at Threshold Studios, Decca, London

Chart positions

Album

Personnel

Musicians
Ray Thomas – flute, bass flute, harmonica, lead vocals, backing vocals
Nicky James – backing vocals
John Jones – acoustic guitar, electric guitar, backing vocals
Trevor Jones – bass guitar, backing vocals
Mike Moran – keyboards
Graham Deakin – drums, percussion
Barry St. John – backing vocals
Liza Strike – backing vocals
Helen Chappelle – backing vocals
Terry James – orchestral arrangements

Production, recording etc.
Ray Thomas – producer
Derek Varnals – associate producer, recording engineer
Dave Baker – recording engineer
Phil Travers – illustration and design
Gered Mankowitz – photography

1976 albums
Ray Thomas albums
Threshold Records albums